USS Cread (APD-88) was a  that served in the United States Navy from 1945 to 1946. She was sold for scrapping in 1961.

Namesake
Walter Irving Cread was born on 18 November 1923 in Los Angeles, California. He enlisted in the United States Naval Reserve 18 August 1941. As fireman second class, Cread was killed in action 12 December 1942 while attached to Motor Torpedo Boat Squadron Two.

History
USS Cread was laid down as  "DE-227" on 16 October 1943 at the Philadelphia Naval Shipyard, and launched on 12 February 1944. She was converted to a  before her construction was complete, and commissioned on 29 July 1945.

Decommissioning and fate
The war ended before her training was complete and she was decommissioned on 15 March 1946, and laid up in the Atlantic Reserve Fleet at Green Cove Springs, Florida. She was stricken from the Naval Register on 1 June 1960, and sold for scrapping to the Southern Scrap Metal Company on 16 March 1961.

Sources
 NavSource Online: Amphibious Photo Archive - DE-227 / APD-88 Cread

Ships built in Philadelphia
1944 ships
Crosley-class high speed transports